John Doman Turner (25 October 1871 – 3 January 1938) was a deaf British painter and member of the Camden Town Group.

Born in Brixton in London, Turner received artistic training by correspondence from Spencer Gore while working as a stockbroker's clerk.  This correspondence still exists, and has been used by subsequent artists, for example Esther Freud in her novel The Sea House.

Turner exhibited twelve works with the Camden Town Group in three exhibitions between 1911 and 1912 (see 'Works' below).

During his later life Turner went on to paint four unique scrolls including the Walberswick Scroll, a 123-foot 'Dioramic Pictorial Record of a Suffolk Village''' which detailed every dwelling of the Suffolk village of Walberswick. This was followed by the Trinity Fair Scroll, a portrait of a travelling circus, which can be seen at the Swan Hotel, Southwold.

The Walberswick Scroll has made several appearances on TV, the first on ITV News in May 2017, the second on More 4's 'Penelope Keith's Coastal Villages' in January 2018.

He died from pneumonia at his Streatham home on 3 January 1938.

A major exhibition of his work was displayed in the University of Hull, and at the Michael Parkin Gallery in 1997.

During the early 1990s Southampton Art Gallery acquired an example of the work of John Doman Turner titled The Joy Wheel Mitcham. Every year the fun fair arrived on Mitcham Common and just a few years before the outbreak of the 1914–18 war JDT went and painted the watercolour.

He also painted other works of Mitcham around the same time which come from the same collection. 

 Works 
John Doman Turner's works include the following, as featured at the Camden Town Group exhibitions:
 Duncan and Godfrey in ‘The Coster’s Courtship’ Elizabeth II at Brighton In the Grand Circle Brighton Shelters Walberswick
 HMS - Sheerness St. Valery-S-Somme The Sound of Kerrera and Kerrera Island, Oban Eastbourne Canal Boats The Fair Green, Mitcham Mitcham CommonIn the 1930s John Doman Turner painted four huge scrolls in watercolour:
 Ferry Road Scroll Walberswick Scroll Trinity Fair Scroll Fairground Frieze''

References

1873 births
1938 deaths
19th-century English painters
English male painters
20th-century English painters
Deaf artists
English deaf people
20th-century English male artists
19th-century English male artists